Fopay Peak is a peak  northwest of Mount Macbain, on the south side of Cornwall Glacier, in the Queen Elizabeth Range, Antarctica. It was named by the Advisory Committee on Antarctic Names for Charles F. Fopay, a Weather Central Meteorologist at Little America V, 1958.

References 

Mountains of the Ross Dependency
Shackleton Coast